A flag protocol defines the proper placement, handling, use, and disposal of flags. Some countries have added certain protocols into their legal system while others prefer to have "guidelines" without civil or criminal consequences attached.

General guidelines

General guidelines are accepted practically universally.

On a mast or pole
The flag of honor, which is the nation's flag in most cases, is flown on the center mast if possible. It is also correct to fly the flag on its own right. To an observer it would be on the far left. If more than three flags are used, the proper position is as far left from the point of view of an observer. An additional flag may be placed on the right side, but is not necessary.

When two poles are crossed, the position of honor is the flag that ends on the left side from the point of view of an observer (the pole will therefore end on the right).

In a semicircle, the position of honor is the center. If a full circle is used outside an entrance to an arena or stadium, the position of honor is directly over the entrance. If used to line the walls of the arena, the flag should be placed directly opposite the entrance.

Hanging
When flown horizontally, as from a flag pole, the flag should be oriented so that the canton is closest to the top of the pole. If hung against a wall, the canton should be placed in the upper-left corner from the point of view of the observer.

When hung vertically, flags should be rotated so the canton is again closest to the top of the pole. If the flag is displayed against a wall, the canton should again appear in the upper-left corner, which requires that the flag be both rotated and "flipped" from its horizontal orientation.

Other places
On a vehicle the flag should be put on a window or affixed securely to the front of the chassis, on the nearside of the vehicle, i.e. the one opposite the driver. (In other words, in countries that drive on the right hand side of the road, a flag is on the right of the vehicle.) On a vehicle where a visiting Head of State or Government is sharing a car with the host Head of State or Government, the host's flag takes the nearside position, the guest's flag on the offside.

When placed with a podium or at a place of worship, the flag should hang directly behind or on a pole to the right of the speaker, from the point of view of the flag.

When carried in single file, the flag of honor leads.

Multiple flags
When flags of many nations are flown, the flag of the hosting country should be placed on the left with the rest following in alphabetical order in the language of the host country. The flag of any sovereign nation should not be displayed over that of another, except when the nations are at war with each other.

On a helicopter
Sometimes in a ceremonial flypast, a flag is flown from a weighted rope dangling from beneath a helicopter.

By country

Brunei
Members of the royal family and the nobility each have their own flags. The Standard of the Sultan must be flown only over Istana Nurul Iman. Only the Standard of the Sultan, the Crown Prince, the 'Viziers' and 'Cheterias' (royal nobles) will be flown every day at their respective residents. Other personal royal flags of the Pengirans and personal flags of the non-royal nobles (such as Pehin Manteris) will only be flown during a ceremonial period announced by the Prime Minister's Office such as Sultan's Birthday, Royal Wedding and National Day. The public generally will fly the national flag during these periods. As in many other countries, Bruneians consider it taboo for the flag to touch the ground.

France
When a French vessel meets another French ship, it is to lower and raise its ensign as a greeting. A merchant ship meeting a ship of the French Navy will greet three times.

India

The flag of India has a very distinctive protocol. It is governed by the Flag Code of India, 2002; the Emblems and Names (Prevention of Improper Use) Act, 1950; and the Prevention of Insults to National Honour Act, 1971.

Insults to the national flag are punishable by law with imprisonment up to three years, or a fine, or both.

Official regulation states that the flag must never touch the ground or water, or be used as a drapery in any form.

Disposal of damaged flags is also covered by the flag code. Damaged or soiled flags may not be cast aside or disrespectfully destroyed; they have to be destroyed as a whole and in private, preferably by burning or by any other method consistent with the dignity of the flag.

Saudi Arabia
Because the flag of Saudi Arabia bears the Shahada, it is never flown at half-mast.

United Kingdom
Unlike many other countries, use of the national flag, the Union Flag, for many informal purposes such as on clothing is accepted.

The Department for Communities and Local Government in November 2012 released the Plain English guide to flying flags for England, a "summary of the new, more liberalised, controls over flag flying that were introduced on 12 October 2012". In England, the statute governing the flying of flags are The Town and Country Planning (Control of Advertisements) (England) (Amendment) Regulations 2007 and 2012.

United States

When displayed either horizontally or vertically against a wall, the union should be uppermost and to the flag's own right, that is, to the observer's left. When displayed in a window, the flag should be displayed in the same way, with the union or blue field to the left of the observer in the street.

The flag should be to the speaker's right (also described as the flag's own right or audience's left), that is to the left of the podium or pulpit as the speaker is facing the audience. Old guidelines had a distinction whether the flag was at the level of the speaker on a stage or the level of the audience. That distinction has been eliminated and the rule simplified.

When the flag is displayed at half-staff, it is customary to raise it briskly to the top the flag pole, then lower it slowly to the half-way mark. This is also done when lowering the flag. The flag is only displayed at half-staff by presidential decree or act of Congress, except on two days: On Pearl Harbor Remembrance Day, the flag can be displayed at half-staff until sundown; on Memorial Day, the flag is flown at half-staff until noon, and then raised to full staff for the remainder of the day.

When displaying the US flag, it is customary for it to be above a state's flag when flown on the same pole. When flown separately, a state's flag may be at the same height as the US flag, with the US flag to the left of the state flag, from the perspective of the viewer. When flown with several state flags, the US flag should be at the same height and to the flag's own right (viewer's left), or at the center of and higher than a grouping of state flags. The idea that only the Texas and Hawaii flags—having been the national flags of the Republic of Texas and the Kingdom of Hawaii—may be flown at an equal height to the US flag is a legend. In fact, any other flag may be flown at an equal height to the US flag provided the US flag is at the leftmost staff from the perspective of the viewer.

The flag of the United States is used to drape the coffins of deceased veterans of the armed forces. When it is so used, the Union (white stars on blue background) is placed above the deceased's left shoulder.

According to United States Code found in Title 4, Chapter 1 pertaining to patriotic customs and observances:

These laws were supplemented by executive orders and presidential proclamations.

Uruguay
National flags cannot be adulterated on any way, nor be used with other intention than as national symbols as stated by law. It is also prohibited for buildings to raise flags other than national flags. The public loyalty oath to the flag must be taken once by every citizen and is celebrated on 19 June at learning institutes. Disposal of damaged flags is done by the Uruguayan Army. Each year on 24 September damaged flags are burnt as an official act.

See also
 Courtesy flag
 Flag desecration
 Vexillology

References

Further reading

External links
 US Flag Disposal Instructions
 Royal Yachting Association's advice on flag etiquette
 US Flag Etiquette
 UK flag flying protocol

Etiquette
Vexillology
Water transport